Sai Thong Watthana is a district (amphoe) of Kamphaeng Phet province, central Thailand.

Geography
Neighbouring districts are (from the south clockwise): Bueng Samakkhi, Khlong Khlung, and Sai Ngam of Kamphaeng Phet Province; and Sam Ngam of Phichit province.

History
The minor district (king amphoe) was established on 1 April 1992 by splitting off three tambons from Khlong Khlung district. Originally named Thung Sai after the central tambon, it was renamed Sai Thong Watthana in 1995. It was upgraded to a full district on 11 October 1997.

Administration

Central administration 
The district Sai Thong Watthana is subdivided into 3 subdistricts (Tambon), which are further subdivided into 38 administrative villages (Muban).

Local administration 
There is one subdistrict municipality (Thesaban Tambon) in the district:
 Thung Sai consisting of the complete subdistrict Thung Sai.

There are 2 subdistrict administrative organizations (SAO) in the district:
 Thung Thong consisting of the complete subdistrict Thung Thong.
 Thawon Watthana consisting of the complete subdistrict Thawon Watthana.

References

External links
amphoe.com

Sai Thong Watthana